Trichastylopsis is a longhorn beetle genus of the subfamily Lamiinae named by Lawrence S. Dillon in 1956.

Species
 Trichastylopsis albidus (LeConte, 1852)
 Trichastylopsis hoguei Chemsak & Linsley, 1978

References

Acanthocinini